The NSW TrainLink H sets, also referred to as the OSCAR (Outer Suburban CAR) trains, are a class of electric multiple units currently operated by NSW TrainLink. Built by UGL Rail in Broadmeadow, the H sets first entered service under the CityRail brand in December 2006, with the last in December 2012. Their introduction allowed for the retirement of some V set carriages (DCM and DCT). As long-distance trains, the H sets share a similar overall layout and design to the previous G sets. Currently operating as 55 four-carriage sets, the H sets now operate between Sydney and Newcastle and between Sydney and the South Coast.

Design

There are many similarities between the H sets and the M sets, including improved external destination boards, internal destination boards displaying stopping patterns, Digital Voice Announcements, security cameras, and green target plates. The OSCARs also have additional features to increase comfort on the longer journeys they operate. These include high back seating covered with durable, vandal-proof woollen moquette fabric with padded head-rests, retractable footrests, luggage racks, aisle seat armrests and a wheelchair-accessible toilet. Wheelchair seating is available in the vestibules, while 3x2 seating is provided in the upper and lower deck sections. Carriage interiors were designed by Transport Design International
The OSCARs also include several new safety features. The doors on older rolling stock such as V sets are all unlocked at every station (even short platforms). V Sets have doors that must be slid open for alighting/boarding and G Sets have push buttons. However, on the H set, the guard is able to select the number of doors to be opened at a station. This feature is aimed at preventing incidents where passengers may fall from the carriage when stopped at a short platform. The H sets have been fitted with Dellner automatic couplers, compatible with the M sets and the Hunter railcars. They are able to absorb the impact of a collision, and the anti-climbers on the H sets will also reduce the force of impact. The trains also have a different body design. Instead of the entire body being of the same design, like the Tangara, the driver's cab is built like a protective cage, made of fibreglass and supported by a box section steel frame, which stretches to the end of the guard's door. The rest of the train is made from conventional stainless steel.

Delivery
The initial order was for 41 cars and the contract was awarded in February 2003. The second order for 81 cars was awarded in April 2005 and the third in March 2009 for 72 cars, increased to 74 in March 2010 and 99 in January 2011. The OSCARs were late in starting service as CityRail wanted to test the trains thoroughly after the M sets had a troubled introduction. On 5 August 2006, set H3 was opened for inspection to the public, as part of Central station's Centenary celebrations.

On 15 December 2006, the OSCARs entered revenue service between Central and Wollongong on Thursdays and Fridays. A few months later, OSCARs operated the services on all weekdays. Their progressive entry into service allowed the G sets to be redeployed on services to Wyong and Springwood. From 30 April 2007, the H sets were introduced on other services, but the original OSCAR service reverted to G Set operation. Eight car operation started on 26 November 2007.

On 8 April 2008, H sets were introduced on the Central Coast & Newcastle Line, operating in eight-car formations, principally between Sydney and Wyong, however they have been used for Newcastle services. H sets were the first rolling stock to be used on the Epping to Chatswood railway line, operating a shuttle service from 23 February 2009 to 10 October 2009. Four car sets operated on the line exclusively during the shuttle phase until it was integrated into the Northern line service.

An additional order for 72 cars was confirmed on 27 March 2009, forming 18 additional four-car sets. The 2010 State budget increased this order to 74 cars. The two additional cars will become spares. The first train from this order entered service on 18 October 2010. In response to passenger feedback, these carriages feature an additional 20 millimetres of padding on the seat backing and lengthened seat bases to increase comfort.

The final H set was delivered to CityRail in December 2012 along with spare driver trailer OD 6850.

In service 
H sets are operated by NSW TrainLink on the following lines:
South Coast Line: Bondi Junction, Martin Place & Central to Port Kembla & Kiama
Central Coast & Newcastle Line: Central & Blacktown to Gosford, Wyong & Newcastle

H sets are used on a limited number of Sydney Trains services on the following lines:
T1 North Shore & Western Line
T4 Eastern Suburbs & Illawarra Line
T9 Northern Line

Future
With the D sets to commence service in 2023, these new trains will allow the H sets to be transferred to suburban services and replace the K sets.

References

External links

Technical drawings & specifications Transport for NSW

Double-decker EMUs
Electric multiple units of New South Wales
NSW TrainLink
Sydney Trains
Train-related introductions in 2006
1500 V DC multiple units of New South Wales